Laskavyi Mai (may also be spelled as 'Laskavyy May', 'Laskavy May', 'Laskavy Mai', 'Laskaviy May') is a Soviet boy band from Moscow founded by Russian songwriter, composer and musician Sergei Kuznetsov. The group's best-known member was Yuri Shatunov, who has subsequently gone on to some solo success. The group disbanded in 1992. Laskavyi Mai once had been called "the legends of the 80–90s".

The band has made a comeback since 2009 as a new Russian band under some changed membership of Andrei Razin, Sergey Serkov, Andrei Kucherov, and Sergei Lenyuk.

Career 
Laskavyi Mai was formed in the middle of the 1980s when Sergei Kuznetsov decided to create a group of musicians with orphan children from an orphanage in Orenburg. The group's first album became legendary in the history of the Soviet pop. The style of the group is a mix of Western disco pop music made on the synthesizer with plain lyrics and sung with a jazzy voice. The group Vesyolye Rebyata was a big rival, with their hit "Rozovye Rozy" (Pink Roses) being nearly as popular as Laskaviy May's "Belye Rozy" (White Roses).

Members
(Russian names in parentheses)

1986–1992 period
Vocalists
Yuri Shatunov (Юрий Шатунов) (died 2022)
Andrei Razin (Андрей Разин)
Andrey Gurov  (Андрей Гуров)
Anton Tokarev (Антон Токарев)
Viktor Kulikov (Виктор Куликов)
Vlada Moscovskaya  (Влада Московская) (died 2006)
Oleg Krestovsky (Олег Крестовский)
Konstantin Pakhomov (Константин Пахомов)
Vladimir Shurochkin (Владимир Шурочкин)
Rafael Isangulov (Рафаэль Исангулов) – also keyboardist
Yuri Barabash (Юрий Барабаш) (died 1996)
Yuri Gurov (Юрий Гуров) (died 2012)
ANNA DORENKO (АННА ДОРЕНКО) (died 2017)
  

Key staff
Sergei Kuznetsov (Сергей Кузнецов) — founder, lyricist, composer, arranger, keyboardist (died 2022)
Vladimir Boyko (Владимир Бойко) – musical director, composer
Alla Goltseva (Алла Гольцева) – lyricist (for Razin, Shatunov, Krestovskiy and other soloists)
Rashid Dayrabaev (Рашид Дайрабаев) – band's first director (died 2013)
Arkady Kudryashov (Аркадий Кудряшов) – band administrator
Anatoly Meshaev (Анатолий Мешаев) composer, arranger
Natalia Grozovskii (Наталья Грозовская) – vocal group "Белые розы" "Belye Rozi" (meaning "White Roses") – after a famous song by the band
Eugene Zakulaev (Евгений Закулаев) – deputy general director of the orphanage

Musicians
Igor Anisimov (Игорь Анисимов) – main keyboardist of the first band (1986–1991)
Alexei Burda (Алексей Бурда) – keyboards
Alexander Priko (Александр Прико) – keyboards (died 2020)
Evgeny Bychkov (Евгений Бычков) – keyboards
Sergei Kulagin (Сергей Кулагин) – keyboards
Arvid Yurgaytis (Арвид Юргайтис) – keyboards (died 2004)
Mikhail Sukhomlinov (Михаил Сухомлинов) – keyboards (died 1993) 
Vyacheslav Ponomarev (Вячеслав Пономарёв) – bass guitar
Igor Safiullin (Игорь Сафиуллин)  – saxophone
Igor Igoshin (Игорь Игошин) – drums, percussion engineer (died 1992)
Sergei Lenyuk (Сергей Ленюк)- drums

Technicians
Oleg Andreev (Олег Андреев) – sound engineer
Alexander Egunov (Александр Егунов) – sound engineer
Vladimir Hozyaenko (Владимир Хозяенко) – sound engineer
Pavel Tomov (Павел Томов) – sound engineer

2009 reformed band members
Andrei Razin (Андрей Разин)
Sergei Serkov (Сергей Серков)
Andrei Kucherov (Андрей Кучеров)
Sergei Lenyuk (Сергей Ленюк)

Discography
 White Roses/Tender  - 1 May (1988)
 Autumn is slowly leaving/Tender  - 2 May (1988)
 A little about myself/Old Forest (1988)
 Broken Love (1988)
 8 March (1989)
 Pink Evening (1989)
 On the roof (1989)
 Goodbye Baby (1989)
 Tender Summer (1989)
 Fairy Shore (1989)
 October Album (1989)
 Stupid snowflakes (1990)
 Matryoshka Masha (1990)
 Naughty girl (1990)
 Come back (1990)
 Island for two (1990)
 Close the door on me (1991)
 Chance Encounter/Younger Sister (1992)
 The Best (1996)
 CPR (1996)
 Legends #1 (2000)
 Legends #2 (2000)
 Legends #3 (2000)
 Star (2007)
 All hits (2008)
 New songs (2016)

Feature film
In 2009, Russian film director  Vladimir Vinogradov released his film titled Laskovyi Mai, a biographical drama film about this band's career.

Cast
(in alphabetical order)
Vyacheslav Manucharov as Andrei Razin
Vasiliy Belokopytov as Nach. Okhrany
Dmitriy Blokhin as Chairman of the Kolkhoz 
Danila Chvanov		
Ekaterina Fedulova as Lilya
Raisa Konyukhova as Mariya Gorbacheva
Maksim Kostromykin as Maksim
Maksim Litovchenko as Sergei Kuznetsov
Viktoriya Matveyeva as Mother of Viti
Aleksandr Nekhoroshikh		
Marina Oryol as Katenka
Sergei Romanovich		
Raisa Ryazanova as Direktrisa Detdoma
Petr Skvortsov as Kolya
Nikita Slepchenkov		
Vladimir Steklov		
Inga Strelkova-Oboldina		
Viktor Verzhbitsky		
Lyudmila Zaytseva as Grandmother Andrei Razin

References

External links
 IMDb.com: Laskoviy Mai film page
 
 

Soviet pop music groups
Musical groups established in 1986
1986 establishments in the Soviet Union
Russian boy bands